William Patrick Kennedy (3 August 1875 – 28 December 1939) was an Australian rules footballer who played with Collingwood in the Victorian Football League (VFL).

Notes

External links 

Bill Kennedy's profile at Collingwood Forever

1875 births
1939 deaths
Australian rules footballers from Victoria (Australia)
Collingwood Football Club players